Vanki is a rural locality (a selo) and the administrative center of Vankovskoye Rural Settlement, Chaykovsky, Perm Krai, There are 18 streets.

Geography 
Vanki is located 78 km northeast of Chaykovsky. Stepanovo is the nearest rural locality.

References 

Rural localities in Chaykovsky urban okrug